83rd Street station is an electrified commuter rail station along the South Chicago Branch of the Metra Electric Line on the South Side of the city of Chicago.

West of this station is another Metra Electric station along 83rd Street known as 83rd Street (Avalon Park) along the Main Branch. Station-side and on-street parking are available next to the 83rd Street railroad crossing. South of the station, the line curves southeast onto another abandoned railroad right-of-way as it heads towards 93rd Street Station.

Bus connections
CTA
  N5 South Shore Night Bus 
  26 South Shore Express 
  71 71st/South Shore

References

External links

Metra stations in Chicago